The Solar Settlement at Schlierberg is a 59-home PlusEnergy housing community in Freiburg, Germany.  Solar architect Rolf Disch wanted to apply his PlusEnergy concept, created originally with his Heliotrope home, to mass residential production. The residential complex won such awards as House of the Year (2002), Residential PV solar integration award (2002), and "Germany's most beautiful housing community" (2006). 
It is one of the first housing communities in the world in which all the homes produce a positive energy balance and which is emissions-free and  neutral.

Location
The Solar Settlement at Schlierberg is a 59-home PlusEnergy housing community at Elly-Heuss-Knapp-Strasse/  Rosa-Luxemburg-Strasse adjacent to the Vauban quarter about 3 km from Freiburg city centre in South West Germany. Five rows of terraced houses with a Southern orientation are grouped to the left and right of a central access road, housing about 170 residents.

Buildings
Construction began 1999 and the settlement was completed in 2006. 
The houses contain 2-3 floors and were built with ecological building materials via wooden post-and-beam construction from regional forests and prefabricated individual modules, PVC-free, and environmentally friendly insulation materials. 

Apartment sizes are from 81 to 210 m2 and are rental and owner-occupied. An underground parking lot keeps the street car free.

Energy
The houses are oriented to the South for optimal passive and active use of solar energy. 
Thermal insulation is used according to passive house standard, including glazing of the main facades with a U-value of 0.5, resulting in a heat requirement of only 11-14 kilowatt hours per m2 and year, which as of 2012 was 200 € (including maintenance costs) per year. Each house has a decentralized ventilation system with heat recovery. The settlement is connected to a local heating network. 

The south facing roofs are covered with photovoltaic modules with a generation potential of 445 kWp of the entire site. As of 2022, it is the largest residential roof-integrated photovoltaic system. 

PlusEnergy is a concept developed by Rolf Disch denoting a "structure's extreme energy efficiency so that it holds a positive energy balance", producing more energy than it uses.  In 1994, Disch had created the first PlusEnergy house in the world with the completion of his private residence, the Heliotrope. According to Disch "PlusEnergy is a fundamental environmental imperative".

Awards
The settlement and the PlusEnergy house concept won the following prizes:
 1999, 1st prize "Innovation Award " of the German magazine Immobilien Manager
 2000, 1st prize "Holzkreativpreis" of BUND e.V.
 2001 / 2002, 1st prize "Architecture prize for single-family houses" from Stern (magazine)
 2001, 2nd prize "Photovoltaic Architecture Prize Baden- Württemberg".
 European Solar Prize from Eurosolar e.V. for Rolf Disch s commitment

See also

 Sustainable architecture
 Energy-plus-house
 Passive solar design
 Green building
 Zero-energy building

References

External links
 Rolf Disch Solar Architecture
  PlusEnergy
 Solar Settlement and Sun Ship Video

Buildings and structures in Freiburg im Breisgau
Solar architecture
Solar design
Sustainable building
Housing in Germany
Solar energy in Germany